The electoral district of Polwarth is an electoral district of the Victorian Legislative Assembly. It is located in south-west rural Victoria, west of Geelong, and covers the Colac and Corangamite local government areas (LGA), parts of the Moyne, Golden Plains and Surf Coast LGAs, and slivers of the Ararat and Greater Geelong LGAs, running along the Great Ocean Road taking in Anglesea, Cape Otway, Peterborough, Aireys Inlet, Lorne, Wye River, Apollo Bay and Port Campbell, covering the inland towns of Winchelsea, Colac, Camperdown and Terang along the Princes Highway, and Inverleigh, Cressy, Lismore and Mortlake on the Hamilton Highway, and finally, includes the Otway Ranges and Lake Corangamite.

The seat has existed since 1889 and has always been held by conservative parties. The Liberal Party has held the seat continuously since 1970, although the Nationals have provided strong challenges on occasions, such as at the 1999 election when election night figures suggested retired AFL Footballer Paul Couch would win the seat. Ultimately, however, Couch failed to finish ahead of the Labor Party candidate and the Liberal candidate, Terry Mulder, won after receiving preferences from Couch.

The 2014 Victorian election saw the Liberal Terry Mulder retain his seat, with a 3.2% swing to Labor. Mulder resigned from parliament on 3 September 2015. The subsequent by-election, held on 31 October, saw Richard Riordan elected as the new member.

Members for Polwarth

Election results

Historical maps

See also
 2015 Polwarth state by-election

References

External links
 Electorate profile: Polwarth District, Victorian Electoral Commission

Electoral districts of Victoria (Australia)
1889 establishments in Australia
Shire of Corangamite
Shire of Colac Otway
Surf Coast Shire
Barwon South West (region)